Washington Rock State Park is a  scenic state park on top of the first Watchung Mountain in Green Brook, New Jersey. The park is operated and maintained by the New Jersey Division of Parks and Forestry.

It is famous for its scenic overlook used by General George Washington in 1777 to monitor troops led by British General William Howe. The  panoramic vista covers the eastern plains of New Jersey up to New York City.

The land was bought in 1913 to establish the park and commemorate the events of 1777. Most of it is woodland but at the outlook there are walking trails and a picnic area.

Gallery

See also

List of New Jersey state parks

References

External links
 
 

American Revolutionary War sites
State parks of New Jersey
Parks in Somerset County, New Jersey
Watchung Mountains
Green Brook Township, New Jersey